Jack Maunder (born 5 April 1997) is an English rugby union player who plays Scrum-half for Exeter Chiefs in the Aviva Premiership.

Club career
In October 2016, Maunder made his club debut for the Exeter Chiefs against ASM Clermont Auvergne in the pool stage of the Champions Cup. On 19 March 2017, Maunder started for Exeter in the final of the Anglo-Welsh Cup, losing to the Leicester Tigers.

Maunder was a key part of the Chiefs premiership winning season playing 13 games and starting 5 throughout the season in his breakthrough year.

International career
Maunder has represented England at U16 and U18 levels. He was named in the England U20 squad for their 2016 campaign but was unable to feature due to a fractured wrist. On 20 April 2017, Eddie Jones named Maunder in a 31-man squad for the summer tour of Argentina. Maunder made his debut in the first test against Argentina, coming on for Danny Care in the 77th minute.

On 3 August 2017, Maunder was selected for Eddie Jones' pre-season England training squad. The Chief was selected after his successful tour with England in Argentina over the summer of 2017.

References

External links
 Exeter Chiefs profile
 RFU profile
 ESPN scrum profile

1997 births
Living people
England international rugby union players
English rugby union players
Exeter Chiefs players
People educated at Blundell's School
Rugby union players from Exeter
Rugby union scrum-halves